Mark Christopher Hickman OAM (born 22 August 1973 in Darwin, Northern Territory) is a field hockey goalkeeper from Australia. He was a part of the team that won the gold medal at the 2004 Summer Olympics in Athens, Greece.

External links
 
 Profile on Hockey Australia

1973 births
Living people
Australian male field hockey players
Olympic field hockey players of Australia
Male field hockey goalkeepers
Olympic gold medalists for Australia
2002 Men's Hockey World Cup players
Field hockey players at the 2004 Summer Olympics
Recipients of the Medal of the Order of Australia
Sportspeople from Darwin, Northern Territory
People educated at Hale School
Olympic medalists in field hockey
Medalists at the 2004 Summer Olympics
Commonwealth Games medallists in field hockey
Commonwealth Games gold medallists for Australia
Field hockey players at the 1998 Commonwealth Games
Field hockey players at the 2002 Commonwealth Games
Medallists at the 1998 Commonwealth Games
Medallists at the 2002 Commonwealth Games